The TK Elevator Test Tower (TK-Elevator-Testturm) is an elevator test tower in Rottweil, Germany. It is owned by TK Elevator, who have their elevator research campus nearby. At , the tower contains Germany's tallest observation deck. It was completed in 2017 and was the tallest elevator test tower in the world then, as well as the second-largest elevator test chamber after a former mine shaft used by Kone.

References 

ThyssenKrupp
Elevator test towers
Towers in Germany
Buildings and structures in Rottweil (district)